VNN may refer to:

 Republic of Vietnam Navy, the navy of the former country of South Vietnam
 Vanguard News Network, a Neo-Nazi and white supremacist website
 Votorantim Novos Negócios, Brazilian private equity firm
 Volksnationalisten Nederland ("People's Nationalists Netherlands"), former Dutch political party
 Vought News Network (VNN): Seven on 7 with Cameron Coleman, a 2021 promotional web series
 Viral nervous necrosis, fish disease caused by viruses in the genus Betanodavirus

See also
 VNN1 and VNN2, human genes encoding proteins of the Vanin family of proteins